The 2012 East Renfrewshire Council election took place on 3 May 2012 to elect members of East Renfrewshire Council. The election used the six wards created as a result of the Local Governance (Scotland) Act 2004, with each ward electing three or four Councillors using the single transferable vote system a form of proportional representation, with 20 Councillors being elected.

The election saw Labour gain 1 seat while also increasing their vote share. The Scottish Conservative and Unionist Party lost 1 seat and saw their vote share fall as they now become the second largest party on the Council. The Scottish National Party gained 1 seat to increase their numbers to 4 and remained the third largest party. Independents retained their 2 seats while the Scottish Liberal Democrats were wiped out again losing their single seat on the authority.

Following the election the Labour Party formed a Coalition with SNP and the Independent Danny Devlin. This was in effect a continuation of the previous Labour - SNP - Independent - Lib Dem coalition administration which had existed before 2012.

Election result

Note: "Votes" are the first preference votes. The net gain/loss and percentage changes relate to the result of the previous Scottish local elections on 3 May 2007. This may differ from other published sources showing gain/loss relative to seats held at dissolution of Scotland's councils.

Ward results

Neilston, Uplawmoor and Newton Mearns North
2007: 2xCon; 1xLab; 1xSNP
2012: 2xLab; 1xCon; 1xSNP
2007-2012: Lab gain one seat from Con

Barrhead
2007: 2xLab; 1xIndependent; 1xSNP
2012: 2xLab; 1xIndependent; 1xSNP
2007-2012: No change

Giffnock and Thornliebank
2007: 1xLab; 1xCon; 1xLib Dem
2012: 1xLab; 1xCon; 1xSNP
2007-2012: SNP gain one seat from Lib Dem

Netherlee, Stamperland and Williamwood
2007: 1xLab; 1xIndependent; 1xCon
2012: 1xLab; 1xIndependent; 1xCon
2007-2012: No change

Newton Mearns South
2007: 2xCon; 1xLab
2012: 2xCon; 1xLab
2007-2012: No change

Busby, Clarkston and Eaglesham
2007: 1xLab; 1xCon; 1xSNP
2012: 1xLab; 1xSNP; 1xCon
2007-2012: No change

Post-Election Changes
† Netherlee, Stamperland and Williamwood Conservative Cllr Gordon McCaskill was suspended by the party following comments he made on Twitter about Scotland's First Minister, Nicola Sturgeon, and Islamic State. He has since been reinstated by the Conservative Group.

References

Source: http://www.eastrenfrewshire.gov.uk/index.aspx?articleid=3565

2012 Scottish local elections
2012